The Hohberghorn (4,219 m) is a mountain in the Pennine Alps in Switzerland. It lies towards the northern end of the Nadelgrat, a high-level ridge running roughly north–south, north of the Dom, above the resort of Saas-Fee to the east, and the Mattertal to the west.

It was first climbed by R. B. Heathcote, with guides Franz Biner, Peter Perren and Peter Taugwalder on, in August 1869 via the west gully above the Hohberg Glacier to the Stecknadeljoch.

Its north-east face, not as long or as steep as that on the neighbouring Lenzspitze, is 320 m and at an average angle of 50 degrees, and might be considered as excellent training for the latter.

See also

List of 4000 metre peaks of the Alps

References

 Dumler, Helmut and Willi P. Burkhardt, The High Mountains of the Alps, London: Diadem, 1994

External links
 
 "The Nadelgrat". SummitPost.org
 Hohberghorn on Hikr

Alpine four-thousanders
Mountains of the Alps
Mountains of Valais
Pennine Alps
Mountains of Switzerland
Four-thousanders of Switzerland